The Iceland or Icelandic catshark (Apristurus laurussonii) is a species of catshark, belonging to the family Scyliorhinidae. This catshark is found in the western Atlantic, from Massachusetts, Delaware, and the northern Gulf of Mexico, as well as the eastern Atlantic from Iceland, southwestern Ireland, the Canary Islands, Madeira, South Africa, and between 67 and 11°N. They are found in depths of 550 to 1450 meters near or at the bottom over upper continental slopes.

Etymology
The catshark was named in honor of Sæmundsson’s friend Gísli Lárusson (1865-1935), a goldsmith, a watchmaker, farmer and nature enthusiast, for his support of the study of Icelandic fishes.

Description
It has a relatively slender body, tapering slightly toward the head. It has a broad and somewhat long, bell-shaped snout. It has short gill slits, and adults have small eyes. The first and second dorsal fins are almost the same size. It is dark brown with no prominent markings. It reaches a maximum size of around 67 cm. The average size ranges from 50 cm to 60 cm. Its diet consists of squid, bony fish, marine worms (such as the lugworm or clam worm), and crustaceans, including lobster, shrimp, and crabs.

References

 
 Compagno, L.J.V., 1999. Checklist of living elasmobranchs. p. 471-498. In W.C. Hamlett (ed.) Sharks, skates, and rays: the biology of elasmobranch fishes. Johns Hopkins University Press, Maryland.

Iceland catshark
Fish of Iceland
Fish of the North Atlantic
Taxa named by Bjarni Sæmundsson
Iceland catshark